Lightbournus is a genus of sea snails, marine gastropod mollusks in the family Fasciolariidae, the spindle snails, the tulip snails and their allies.

Species
Species within the genus Lightbournus include:

 Lightbournus russjenseni Lyons & Snyder, 2008

References

Fasciolariidae
Monotypic gastropod genera